29-Norlanosterol, or 4-demethyllanosterol, also called 4α,14α-dimethylzymosterol, is a Metabolic intermediate of plant sterol biosynthesis. In the pathway, it is transformed from ring-opening reactions of Norcycloartenol and then demethylation by CYP51 into 4α-methyl-5α-cholesta-8,14,24-trien-3β-ol.

References

Sterols